Scott James Wells (July 4, 1961 – October 28, 2015) was an American actor and model, primarily noted for playing the villain Lex Luthor during the first season of the television series Superboy. After his departure from the series in 1989, Scott Wells appeared in The Taking of Beverly Hills. Subsequently, to this film he retired from show business. Besides acting on TV he could be seen in print ads for Calvin Klein and billboards for Coppertone. In 1988, he appeared in the music video "Anything For You" by Gloria Estefan.

Early life
Scott James Wells was born on July 4, 1961, in Dayton, Ohio. He graduated from West Carrollton High School. Sometime afterwards, he moved to L.A, working as an actor, having appeared in Emergency! and Beauty and the Beast, and a model for fitness and fashion magazines.

Superboy
In 1988, Wells was cast as Superboy's (arch-) enemy Lex Luthor. Playing a younger version of the famous character, he had four guest appearances on the show. After ratings were disappointing, the show's producer Ilya Salkind decided to change aspects of the series. As a consequence, Wells as well as John Haymes Newton (Superboy) were replaced beginning with Season 2. Sherman Howard was then cast as Lex Luthor. The change in appearance was explained due to Luthor having been scarred by a chemical accident which first caused his hair to fall out, then caused accelerated aging. Luthor then got plastic surgery to rectify the accident as well as become a doppelganger of an industrialist (also played by Sherman Howard), whom he murders to replace him and fool Superboy.

In 2006, Salkind explained Wells' absence on the DVD box set of "Superboy: The Complete First Season," due to him being in "rehab,"

Death
Wells died on October 28, 2015, in Dayton, Ohio.

References

External links

1961 births
2015 deaths
20th-century American male actors
American male film actors
American male television actors
Male actors from Dayton, Ohio